Events of the year 1986 in Pakistan.

Incumbents

Federal government 
President: Muhammad Zia-ul-Haq 
Prime Minister: Muhammad Khan Junejo
Chief Justice: Mohammad Haleem

Governors 
Governor of Balochistan: Musa Khan
Governor of Khyber Pakhtunkhwa:
 until 18 April: Nawabzada Abdul Ghafoor Khan Hoti
 18 April-27 August: Musa Khan 
 starting 27 August: Fida Mohammad Khan
Governor of Punjab: Sajjad Hussain Qureshi 
Governor of Sindh: Jahan Dad Khan

Events 
 Zulfiqar Ali Bhutto's daughter Benazir returns from exile to lead the Pakistan Peoples Party (PPP) in a campaign for fresh elections.
 Pan Am Flight 73, with 358 people on board, is hijacked at Karachi International Airport by four Abu Nidal terrorists.

See also
1985 in Pakistan
Other events of 1986
1987 in Pakistan
Timeline of Pakistani history

External links
 Timeline: Pakistan

 
1986 in Asia